Ramsgate Football Club are a football team based in Ramsgate, Kent, England. The main local rivals of the club are Margate who are situated just 4 miles away. When the two teams meet, it is known as the Thanet derby.

History
The earliest incarnation of Ramsgate FC had played since at least 1886 but folded in 1924, with local rivals Ramsgate Glenville taking over their Southwood Stadium.  Glenville did not reform after World War II and a new club dubbed Ramsgate Athletic took over Southwood.  The club retained the Athletic name until 1972.

Athletic played in the original incarnation of the Kent League from their formation until the collapse of the league in 1959.  This was the club's best period for nearly 50 years, with two consecutive league titles, several county cups, and a run to the first round of the FA Cup.  With the collapse of the Kent League the Rams migrated to the Southern League, where they initially did well but were forced to resign and drop down to the re-formed Kent League in 1976.

For nearly thirty years the club performed well without seriously challenging for promotion, but their fortunes changed in 2004 with the return of former manager Jim Ward.  He led the club to two consecutive championships (Kent League Premier Division and Isthmian League First Division), taking the club into the Isthmian League Premier Division for 2006–07, which therefore offered the first derby matches for many years against Isle of Thanet rivals Margate.  In the club's first season in the Premier Division the Rams finished in 9th place, and followed this with an even better season in 2007–08, finishing in 5th place to reach the play-offs, although they were beaten 2–1 in the semi-final by Staines Town.  The Rams also won the Isthmian League Cup, beating AFC Sudbury on penalties at Dartford's Princes Park ground.  The following season, however, Ramsgate finished bottom of the table and were relegated.

Stadium

Ramsgate play their home games at the Southwood Stadium, Price's Avenue, Ramsgate, CT11 0AN.

Southwood Stadium was the home of earlier Ramsgate clubs Ramsgate Town and Ramsgate Grenville, and became the home of Ramsgate Athletic upon their foundation after the Second World War.  The largest crowd registered at the ground was 5,038 for the visit of local rivals Margate in 1955.

Supporters

In the 2007–08 season, Ramsgate's average attendance was 369, the twelfth highest figure in the Isthmian League Premier Division.  For the visit of rivals Margate the crowd was 1,210, nearly double the attendance at any other match.  The 2011–12 season had an average attendance of 159, 2012–13 was 157, 2013–14 was 269, 2014–15 was 248, 2015–16 was 207 and 2016–17 was 237.

Current squad
As of 25 February 2023

Club officials

Ramsgate FC
President: Lord Pendry 
Directors: James Lawson & Richard Lawson 
Vice-Presidents: Martin Able, Kevin Barham, David Butler, Ian Heath, Paul Jefcoate, Richard Lawson, Malcolm Mitchell, Steve Redford, Foy Turner, Colin West 
General Manager: Ian Heath 
Club Secretary: Caroline Greenfield 
Matchday Secretary: Kevin Barham 
Media Officer: Dan Whitehead 
Safety & Welfare Officer: James Lawson 
Equality & Diversity Officer: Elliot Austin 
Programme Editor: Martin Able

Football management
Manager: Jamie Coyle 
Assistant manager: Nicky Southall  
First Team Coach & Goalkeeping coach: Lee Hook 
Kit Man: Carl McCourt 
Physiotherapist: Marc Wheeler

Managerial history

Honours
Isthmian League
First Division Champions 2005–06
League Cup Winners 2007–08
Kent League
Champions 1948–49, 1955–56, 1956–57, 1998–99, 2004–05
League Cup Winners 1948–49, 1992–93, 1993–94, 1994–95, 2000–01, 2004–05
Thames & Medway Combination Champions' Cup
Winners 1959–60
Thames & Medway Combination Eastern Division Champions
1958–59, 1959–60, 1960–61
Kent Senior Cup
Winners 1963–64
Kent Senior Shield
Winners 1960–61, 1967–68, 1968–69
Kent Senior Trophy
Winners 1987–88, 1988–89, 1998–99
Kent League Charity Shield
Winners 1994, 1995, 1997, 2005

Records
Best League performance: 5th in Isthmian League Premier Division, 2007–08
Best FA Cup performance: 1st round proper, 1955–56 and 2005–06
Best FA Trophy performance: 3rd qualifying round, 1969–70, 1975–76, 2008–09, 2009–10, 2012–13 and 2013–14
Best FA Vase performance: Quarter-finals, 1999–2000
Record attendance: 5,038 vs Margate, 1956–57
Biggest victory: 11–0 and 12–1 vs Canterbury City, Kent League, 2000–01
Most goals: Mick Williamson

Former players

References

External links
 Club website

 
Football clubs in Kent
Isthmian League
Association football clubs established in 1886
Ramsgate
Southern Football League clubs
1886 establishments in England
Southern Counties East Football League
Football clubs in England